The Photo Marketing Association International (PMA) International Convention and Trade Show was an annual imaging technology trade show conducted by PMA held in Las Vegas. Since 2012, the show has been branded as PMA@CES, reflecting its rescheduling to coincide with the Consumer Electronics Show, a major annual consumer electronics trade show also held in Las Vegas.

The PMA International Convention and Trade Show is frequently the occasion for the public introduction of important imaging products. The major competition for this trade show is Photokina, held in even-numbered years in Cologne, Germany.

In 2012, PMA announced it would launch an online community known as The Big Photo Show, with associated trade shows under that banner in the U.S. The first such show was held in Los Angeles in May 2013, with another scheduled for that city in May 2014. Unlike PMA@CES, which is restricted exclusively to trade visitors, The Big Photo Show is specifically intended for consumers.

PMA has seven member associations: Association of Imaging Executives, Digital Imaging Marketing Association, National Association of Photo Equipment Technicians, Photo Imaging Education Association, Professional Picture Framers Association PPFA, Professional School Photographers Association and Sports Photographers Association of America.

Shows

PMA and PMA@CES

The Big Photo Show

References

External links 
 PMA - The Worldwide Community of Imaging Associations Home Page
 The Big Photo Show home page
 Professional Picture Framers Association

Trade shows in the United States
American photography organizations